The Mawand mine is one of the largest gypsum mines in Pakistan. The mine is located in Punjab. The mine has reserves amounting to 20 million tonnes of gypsum.

See also 
 List of mines in Pakistan

References 

Mines in Pakistan
Gypsum mines in Pakistan